17th-century Missionary activity in Asia and the Americas grew strongly, put down roots, and developed its institutions, though it met with strong resistance in Japan in particular. At the same time Christian colonization of some areas outside Europe succeeded, driven by economic as well as religious reasons. Christian traders were heavily involved in the Atlantic slave trade, which had the effect of transporting Africans into Christian communities. A land war between Christianity and Islam continued, in the form of the campaigns of the Habsburg Empire and Ottoman Empire in the Balkans, a turning point coming at Vienna in 1683. The Tsardom of Russia, where Orthodox Christianity was the established religion, expanded eastwards into Siberia and Central Asia, regions of Islamic and shamanistic beliefs, and also southwest into the Ukraine, where the Uniate Eastern Catholic Churches arose.

There was a very large volume of Christian literature published, particularly controversial and millennial but also historical and scholarly. Hagiography became more critical with the Bollandists, and ecclesiastical history became thoroughly developed and debated, with Catholic scholars such as Baronius and Jean Mabillon, and Protestants such as David Blondel laying down the lines of scholarship. Christian art of the Baroque and music derived from church forms was striking and influential on lay artists using secular expression and themes. Poetry and drama often treated Biblical and religious matter, for example John Milton's Paradise Lost.

Changing attitudes, Protestant and Catholic
At the beginning of the century James I of England opposed the papal deposing power in a series of controversial works, and the assassination of Henry IV of France caused an intense focus on the theological doctrines concerned with tyrannicide. Both Henry and James, in different ways, pursued a peaceful policy of religious conciliation, aimed at eventually healing the breach caused by the Protestant Reformation. While progress along these lines seemed more possible during the Twelve Years' Truce, conflicts after 1620 changed the picture; and the situation of Western and Central Europe after the Peace of Westphalia left a more stable but entrenched polarisation of Protestant and Catholic territorial states, with religious minorities.

The religious conflicts in Catholic France over Jansenism and Port-Royal produced the controversial work Lettres Provinciales by Blaise Pascal. In it he took aim at the prevailing climate of moral theology, a speciality of the Jesuit order and the attitude of the Collège de Sorbonne. Pascal argued against the casuistry at that time deployed in "cases of conscience", particularly doctrines associated with probabilism.

By the end of the 17th century, the Dictionnaire Historique et Critique by Pierre Bayle represented the current debates in the Republic of Letters, a largely secular network of scholars and savants who commented in detail on religious matters as well as those of science. Proponents of wider religious toleration—and a sceptical line on many traditional beliefs—argued with increasing success for changes of attitude in many areas (including discrediting the False Decretals and the legend of Pope Joan, magic and witchcraft, millennialism and extremes of anti-Catholic propaganda, and toleration of the Jews in society).

Polemicism and eirenicism
Contention between Catholic and Protestant matters gave rise to a substantial polemical literature, written both in Latin to appeal to international opinion among the educated, and in vernacular languages. In a climate where opinion was thought open to argument, the production of polemical literature was part of the role of prelates and other prominent churchmen, academics (in universities) and seminarians (in religious colleges); and institutions such as Chelsea College in London and Arras College in Paris were set up expressly to favor such writing.

The major debates between Protestants and Catholics proving inconclusive, and theological issues within Protestantism being divisive, there was also a return to the Irenicism: the search for religious peace. David Pareus was a leading Reformed theologian who favored an approach based on reconciliation of views. Other leading figures such as Marco Antonio de Dominis, Hugo Grotius and John Dury worked in this direction.

Heresy and demonology
The last person to be executed by fire for heresy in England was Edward Wightman in 1612. The legislation relating to this penalty was in fact only changed in 1677, after which those convicted on a heresy charge would suffer at most excommunication. Accusations of heresy, whether the revival of Late Antique debates such as those over Pelagianism and Arianism or more recent views such as Socinianism in theology and Copernicanism in natural philosophy, continued to play an important part in intellectual life.

At the same time as the judicial pursuit of heresy became less severe, interest in demonology was intense in many European countries. The sceptical arguments against the existence of witchcraft and demonic possession were still contested into the 1680s by theologians. The Gangraena by Thomas Edwards used a framework equating heresy and possession to draw attention to the variety of radical Protestant views current in the 1640s.

Trial of Galileo 

In 1610, Galileo Galilei published his Sidereus Nuncius, describing observations that he had made with the new telescope. These and other discoveries exposed difficulties with the understanding of the heavens current since antiquity and raised interest in teachings such as the heliocentric theory of Copernicus.

In reaction, scholars such as Cosimo Boscaglia maintained that the motion of the Earth and immobility of the Sun were heretical, as they contradicted some accounts given in the Bible as understood at that time. Galileo's part in the controversies over theology, astronomy and philosophy culminated in his trial and sentencing in 1633, on a suspicion of heresy.

The Galileo affair—the process by which Galileo came into conflict with the Roman Catholic Church over his support of Copernican astronomy—has often been considered a defining moment in the history of the relationship between religion and science.

Protestantism

The Protestant lands at the beginning of the 17th century were concentrated in Northern Europe, with territories in Germany, Scandinavia, England, Scotland, and areas of France, the Low Countries, Switzerland, Kingdom of Hungary and Poland. Heavy fighting, in some cases a continuation of the religious conflicts of the previous centuries, was seen, particularly in the Low Countries and the Electorate of the Palatinate (which saw the outbreak of the Thirty Years' War). In Ireland there was a concerted attempt to create "plantations" of Protestant settlers in what was a predominantly Catholic country, and fighting with a religious dimension was serious in the 1640s and 1680s. In France the settlement proposed by the Edict of Nantes was whittled away, to the disadvantage of the Huguenot population, and the edict was revoked in 1685.

Protestant Europe was largely divided into Lutheran and Reformed (Calvinist) areas, with the Church of England maintaining a separate position. Efforts to unify Lutherans and Calvinists had little success; and the ecumenical ambition to overcome the schism of the Protestant Reformation remained almost entirely theoretical. The Church of England under William Laud made serious approaches to figures in the Orthodox Church, looking for common ground.

Within Calvinism an important split occurred with the rise of Arminianism; the Synod of Dort of 1618–19 was a national gathering but with international repercussions, as the teaching of Arminius was firmly rejected at a meeting to which Protestant theologians from outside the Netherlands were invited. The Westminster Assembly of the 1640s was another major council dealing with Reformed theology, and some of its works continue to be important to Protestant denominations.

Puritan movement and English Civil War 

In the 1640s England, Scotland, Wales and Ireland underwent religious strife comparable to that which its neighbours had suffered some generations before. The rancour associated with these wars is partly attributed to the nature of the Puritan movement, a description admitted to be unsatisfactory by many historians. In its early stages the Puritan movement (late 16th–17th centuries) stood for reform in the Church of England, within the Calvinist tradition, aiming to make the Church of England  resemble more closely the Protestant churches of Europe, especially Geneva. The Puritans refused to endorse completely all of the ritual directions and formulas of the Book of Common Prayer; the imposition of its liturgical order by legal force and inspection sharpened Puritanism into a definite opposition movement.

The English Civil War was a series of armed conflicts and political machinations between Parliamentarians and Royalists. The first (1642–46) and second (1648–49) civil wars pitted the supporters of King Charles I against the supporters of the Long Parliament, while the third war (1649–51) saw fighting between supporters of King Charles II and supporters of the Rump Parliament. The wars ended with the Parliamentary victory at the Battle of Worcester on 3 September 1651.

The war led to the trial and execution of Charles I, the exile of his son, Charles II, and replacement of English monarchy with first, the Commonwealth of England (1649–53), and then with a Protectorate (1653–59) under Oliver Cromwell's personal rule. In Ireland military victory for the Parliamentarian forces established the Protestant Ascendancy.

After coming to political power as a result of the First English Civil War, the Puritan clergy had an opportunity to set up a national church along Presbyterian lines; for reasons that were also largely political, they failed to do so effectively. After the English Restoration of 1660 the Church of England was purged within a few years of its Puritan elements. The successors of the Puritans, in terms of their belies, are referred to as Dissenters and Nonconformists, and included those who formed various Reformed denominations.

Puritan emigration

Emigration to North America of Protestants, in what became New England, was led by a group of Puritan separatists based in the Netherlands ("the pilgrims"). Establishing a colony at Plymouth in 1620, they received a charter from the King of England. This successful, though initially quite difficult, colony marked the beginning of the Protestant presence in America (the earlier French, Spanish and Portuguese settlements were Catholic). Unlike the Spanish or French, the English colonists made little initial effort to evangelise the native peoples.

Roman Catholicism

Devotions to Mary
Pope Paul V and Gregory XV ruled in 1617 and 1622 to be invalid to state that Mary was conceived non-immaculate. Alexander VII declared in 1661 that the soul of Mary was free from original sin. Popular Marian piety was even more colourful and varied than ever before: Numerous Marian pilgrimages, Marian Salve devotions, new Marian litanies, Marian theatre plays, Marian hymns, Marian processions. Marian fraternities, today mostly defunct, had millions of members.

Pope Innocent XI
Toward the latter part of the 17th century, Pope Innocent XI viewed the increasing Turkish attacks against Europe, which were supported by France, as the major threat for the Church. He built a Polish-Austrian coalition for the Turkish defeat at Vienna in 1683. Scholars have called him a saintly pope because he reformed abuses by the Church, including simony, nepotism and the lavish papal expenditures that had caused him to inherit a papal debt of 50,000,000 scudi. By eliminating certain honorary posts and introducing new fiscal policies, Innocent XI was able to regain control of the Church's finances.

France and Gallicanism

In 1685, gallicanist King Louis XIV of France issued the Revocation of the Edict of Nantes, ending a century of religious toleration. France forced Catholic theologians to support conciliarism and deny Papal infallibility. The king threatened Pope Innocent XI with a Catholic Ecumenical Council and a military take-over of the Papal state. The absolute French state used gallicanism to  gain control of virtually all major Church appointments as well as many of the Church's properties.

Spread of Christianity 

The expansion of the Catholic Portuguese Empire and Spanish Empire, with a significant role played by the Roman Catholic Church, led to a Christianization of the indigenous peoples of the Americas such as the Aztecs and Incas. Later waves of colonial expansion such as the struggle for India, by the Dutch, England, France, Germany, Russia and Spanish led to Christianization beyond Asia, such as Philippines.

Roman Catholic missions
During the Age of Discovery, the Roman Catholic Church established a number of Missions in the Americas and other colonies in order to spread Christianity in the New World and to convert the indigenous peoples. At the same time, missionaries such as Francis Xavier as well as other Jesuits, Augustinians, Franciscans and Dominicans were moving into Asia and the Far East. The Portuguese sent missions into Africa.

The most significant failure of Roman Catholic missionary work was in Ethiopia. Although its ruler, Emperor Susenyos, had publicly declared his conversion to Catholicism in 1622, the declaration of Roman Catholicism as the official religion in 1626 led to increasing civil war. Following Susenyos' abdication, his son and successor Fasilides expelled archbishop Afonso Mendes and his Jesuit brethren in 1633, then in 1665 ordered the remaining religious writings of the Catholics burnt. On the other hand, other missions (notably Matteo Ricci's Jesuit mission to China) were relatively peaceful and focused on integration rather than cultural imperialism.

The first Catholic Church was built in Beijing in 1650. The emperor granted freedom of religion to Catholics. Ricci had modified the Catholic faith to Chinese thinking, permitting among other things the veneration of the dead. The Vatican disagreed and forbade any adaptation in the so-called Chinese Rites controversy in 1692 and 1742.

Eastern Orthodoxy

Dispute between Constantinople and Alexandria
In a dispute with Patriarch Nicephorus of Alexandria, Ecumenical Patriarch Parthenius I of Constantinople sided with the hierarchs of the Church of Sinai by granting them permission to perform religious services in Cairo when Nicephorus was visiting Moldovlachia. After Nicephorus was back in Alexandria, his protests made Parthenius revoke his permission. Still, the tensions over this issue continued between the two Churches.

Synod of Jassy
In the year 1641 Parthenius summoned a synod at Constantinople, at which eight prelates and four dignitaries of the church were present. In this synod the term Transubstantiation is said to have been authorised. In the next year Parthenius organized the more important Synod of Iași. The purpose of this assembly was to counter certain Catholic and Protestant doctrinal errors which had infiltrated Orthodox theology and to offer a comprehensive Orthodox statement on the truth of faith. Including representatives of the Greek and Slavic Churches, it condemned the Calvinist teachings ascribed to Cyril Lucaris and ratified (a somewhat amended text of) Peter Mogila's Expositio fidei (Statement of Faith, also known as the Orthodox Confession), a description of Christian orthodoxy in a question and answer format. The Statement of Faith became fundamental for establishing the Orthodox world's attitude toward Reformation thought. The major contribution of the synod was the reinforced sense of unity in the Eastern Orthodox Church through the promulgation of an authoritative statement agreed upon by all the major sees.

Synod of Jerusalem
In 1672, Patriarch Dositheos II of Jerusalem convened the Synod of Jerusalem that rejected all the Calvinist doctrines and reformulated Orthodox teachings in a manner that distinguished them from Roman Catholicism as well as Protestantism.

The Synod was attended by most of the prominent representatives of the Eastern Orthodox Church, including six Metropolitans besides Dositheus and his retired predecessor, and its decrees received universal acceptance as an expression of the faith of the Eastern Orthodox Church.

Against both the Roman Catholic Church and most Protestants, the Synod affirmed that the Holy Spirit proceeds from God the Father alone and not from both Father and Son.

In the Synod's decrees, called the Confession of Dositheus, it reaffirmed existing Orthodox beliefs incompatible with Calvinist doctrines, restating that apostolic succession of bishops is necessary, that good works done with faith are required for salvation, that there are seven sacraments, that the Eucharist is both sacrament and sacrifice, offered for the dead as well as for the living.

Russian Orthodox Church
The fall of Constantinople in the East, 1453, led to a significant shift of gravity to the rising state of Russia, the "Third Rome". The Renaissance also stimulated a program of reforms by patriarchs of prayer books. A movement called the "Old believers" consequently resulted and influenced Russian Orthodox theology in the direction of conservatism and Erastianism.

Timeline

See also

Algonquian Bible
History of Christianity
History of Protestantism
Baroque, Enlightenment and revolutions
Ottoman Empire
Renaissance and Reformation
History of Oriental Orthodoxy
Timeline of the English Reformation
Timeline of Christianity
Timeline of Christian missions
Timeline of the Roman Catholic Church
Chronological list of saints and blesseds in the 17th century

References

Further reading 
 Esler, Philip F. The Early Christian World. Routledge (2004). .
 White, L. Michael. From Jesus to Christianity. HarperCollins (2004). .
 Freedman, David Noel (Ed). Eerdmans Dictionary of the Bible. Wm. B. Eerdmans Publishing (2000). .
 Pelikan, Jaroslav Jan. The Christian Tradition: The Emergence of the Catholic Tradition (100–600). University of Chicago Press (1975). .

External links
Schaff's ''The Seven Ecumenical Councils

17
 
17